Lengue may refer to:
Lengue people, an African ethnic group who are indigenous to Equatorial Guinea and Gabon
Lengue language, a Bantu language spoken by the Lengue people
Lengue (film), a 1985 Central African short documentary film directed by Léonie Yangba Zowe
Afzelia africana, a species of wood